WHRF is a Public Radio-formatted broadcast radio station licensed to Belle Haven, Virginia, serving Accomac and Accomack County, Virginia.  WHRF is owned and operated by Hampton Roads Educational Telecommunications Association, Inc. and is a repeater station of WHRO-FM.

References

External links
 WHRO-FM Online
 

2010 establishments in Virginia
Public radio stations in the United States
Classical music radio stations in the United States
NPR member stations
Radio stations established in 2010
HRF